VRPorn.com is an American virtual reality pornography site. It was launched in 2013. VRPorn.com is currently the largest and most popular platform for adult VR content and has content from the top studios such as VR Bangers, VR Conk, Dezyred and more.

History
VRPorn.com was originally created in 2013 as a VR fan site but then shifted to adult content in 2016. The company is based in Los Angeles, United States. As of 2017, most of VRPorn.com's visitors were from North America, Europe, Asia, and Oceania, with more than 8 million monthly visits, and was the highest traffic VR website.

Content
VRPorn.com has over 9600 full scene videos from more than 225 different studios (Dec, 2021), including VR Bangers, BaDoinkVR, and VirtualRealPorn. VRPorn.com offers a huge variety of free videos but most of those are short clips of 5 minutes or less and only a few full-length movies. With a paid membership, you get access to all videos which have a length from 10 minutes up to more than 1 hour, depending on the VR production studio. The quality also ranges from a resolution of 4k from older productions up to 8k for recent movies. The website also has 30 VR porn games that come as a bonus to their premium membership, CGI, augmented reality (AR), X Reality (XR), mixed reality (MR), POV, and hentai content. The website is free to access, but there is also an optional premium membership plan which operates in a similar way to Netflix, Hulu, and Spotify.

Its content can be viewed with Oculus Quest, the PlayStation 4 browser, and PlayStation VR. It also supports Oculus Go, Oculus Rift, HTC Vive, Samsung Gear VR, Google Cardboard, Apple, and Android. Web streaming is provided via WebXR.

See also
BaDoinkVR
VirtualRealPorn

References

External links

Technology companies established in 2013
Virtual reality companies